Florence George Graves is an American journalist and the founding director of the Schuster Institute for Investigative Journalism at Brandeis University.

She is an investigative reporter and editor whose work focuses on exposing abuses of government and corporate power, and on revealing inequities between the powerful and the powerless. She also is a Resident Scholar at the Brandeis Women's Studies Research Center. As an investigative reporter for The Washington Post, she and a colleague broke the Senator Bob Packwood sexual misconduct story, which led to an historic three-year Senate investigation followed by a Senate Ethics Committee vote to expel him and then his forced resignation. She has received a number of prestigious fellowship awards, including from the Institute of Politics at Harvard's Kennedy School of Government, the Radcliffe Public Policy Institute, the Alicia Patterson Journalism Fellowship
 in 1993 and the Pope Foundation.

In the 1980s, Graves founded the nationally circulated political and investigative journal, Common Cause Magazine. It became the largest circulation political magazine in the country (250,000), and the only one whose primary focus was investigative reporting. A 2003 article in Folio magazine said, “If Common Cause Magazine threw a reunion, it would look like a convention of today’s top investigative reporters. With a brand of muckraking that belonged more to the era of Ida Tarbell than of Rupert Murdoch, the magazine attracted and nurtured journalists who had a zeal for exposing the abuses of the powerful.” 

Her work there led to congressional hearings and to reforms in public policies, and has received such prestigious awards as the Investigative Reporters and Editors Award and the 1987 National Magazine Award for General Excellence, the highest award given in magazine journalism.

References

Harvard University Gazette, February 08, 1996 – Radcliffe Public Policy Fellows Address Varied Issues

American women journalists
Living people
Brandeis University faculty
Harvard Kennedy School people
Year of birth missing (living people)